The arrondissement of Cherbourg is an arrondissement of France in the Manche department in the Normandy region. It lies entirely on the Cotentin Peninsula and has 144 communes.

Composition

The communes of the arrondissement of Cherbourg, and their INSEE codes, are:

 Anneville-en-Saire (50013)
 Audouville-la-Hubert (50021)
 Aumeville-Lestre (50022)
 Azeville (50026)
 Barfleur (50030)
 Barneville-Carteret (50031)
 Baubigny (50033)
 Benoîtville (50045)
 Besneville (50049)
 Beuzeville-la-Bastille (50052)
 Biniville (50055)
 Blosville (50059)
 La Bonneville (50064)
 Boutteville (50070)
 Bretteville (50077)
 Breuville (50079)
 Bricquebec-en-Cotentin (50082)
 Bricquebosq (50083)
 Brillevast (50086)
 Brix (50087)
 Canteloup (50096)
 Canville-la-Rocque (50097)
 Carneville (50101)
 Catteville (50105)
 Cherbourg-en-Cotentin (50129)
 Clitourps (50135)
 Colomby (50138)
 Couville (50149)
 Crasville (50150)
 Crosville-sur-Douve (50156)
 Digosville (50162)
 Écausseville (50169)
 Émondeville (50172)
 Éroudeville (50175)
 L'Étang-Bertrand (50176)
 Étienville (50177)
 Fermanville (50178)
 Fierville-les-Mines (50183)
 Flamanville (50184)
 Flottemanville (50186)
 Fontenay-sur-Mer (50190)
 Fresville (50194)
 Gatteville-le-Phare (50196)
 Golleville (50207)
 Gonneville-le-Theil (50209)
 Grosville (50222)
 La Hague (50041)
 Le Ham (50227)
 Hardinvast (50230)
 Hautteville-Bocage (50233)
 La Haye-d'Ectot (50235)
 Héauville (50238)
 Helleville (50240)
 Hémevez (50241)
 Hiesville (50246)
 Huberville (50251)
 Joganville (50258)
 Lestre (50268)
 Liesville-sur-Douve (50269)
 Lieusaint (50270)
 Magneville (50285)
 Martinvast (50294)
 Maupertus-sur-Mer (50296)
 Le Mesnil (50299)
 Le Mesnil-au-Val (50305)
 Les Moitiers-d'Allonne (50332)
 Montaigu-la-Brisette (50335)
 Montebourg (50341)
 Montfarville (50342)
 Morville (50360)
 Négreville (50369)
 Néhou (50370)
 Neuville-au-Plain (50373)
 Neuville-en-Beaumont (50374)
 Nouainville (50382)
 Octeville-l'Avenel (50384)
 Orglandes (50387)
 Ozeville (50390)
 La Pernelle (50395)
 Picauville (50400)
 Pierreville (50401)
 Les Pieux (50402)
 Port-Bail-sur-Mer (50412)
 Quettehou (50417)
 Quinéville (50421)
 Rauville-la-Bigot (50425)
 Rauville-la-Place (50426)
 Reigneville-Bocage (50430)
 Réville (50433)
 Rocheville (50435)
 Le Rozel (50442)
 Saint-Christophe-du-Foc (50454)
 Saint-Cyr (50461)
 Sainte-Colombe (50457)
 Sainte-Geneviève (50469)
 Sainte-Marie-du-Mont (50509)
 Sainte-Mère-Église (50523)
 Saint-Floxel (50467)
 Saint-Georges-de-la-Rivière (50471)
 Saint-Germain-de-Tournebut (50478)
 Saint-Germain-de-Varreville (50479)
 Saint-Germain-le-Gaillard (50480)
 Saint-Jacques-de-Néhou (50486)
 Saint-Jean-de-la-Rivière (50490)
 Saint-Joseph (50498)
 Saint-Marcouf (50507)
 Saint-Martin-d'Audouville (50511)
 Saint-Martin-de-Varreville (50517)
 Saint-Martin-le-Gréard (50519)
 Saint-Maurice-en-Cotentin (50522)
 Saint-Pierre-d'Arthéglise (50536)
 Saint-Pierre-Église (50539)
 Saint-Sauveur-le-Vicomte (50551)
 Saint-Vaast-la-Hougue (50562)
 Saussemesnil (50567)
 Sébeville (50571)
 Sénoville (50572)
 Sideville (50575)
 Siouville-Hague (50576)
 Sortosville (50578)
 Sortosville-en-Beaumont (50577)
 Sottevast (50579)
 Sotteville (50580)
 Surtainville (50585)
 Taillepied (50587)
 Tamerville (50588)
 Teurthéville-Bocage (50593)
 Teurthéville-Hague (50594)
 Théville (50596)
 Tocqueville (50598)
 Tollevast (50599)
 Tréauville (50604)
 Turqueville (50609)
 Urville (50610)
 Valcanville (50613)
 Valognes (50615)
 Varouville (50618)
 Le Vast (50619)
 Vaudreville (50621)
 Le Vicel (50633)
 Vicq-sur-Mer (50142)
 Videcosville (50634)
 Virandeville (50643)
 Yvetot-Bocage (50648)

History

The arrondissement of Cherbourg was created in 1811. At the January 2017 reorganisation of the arrondissements of Manche, it gained two communes from the arrondissement of Coutances.

As a result of the reorganisation of the cantons of France which came into effect in 2015, the borders of the cantons are no longer related to the borders of the arrondissements. The cantons of the arrondissement of Cherbourg were, as of January 2015:

 Barneville-Carteret
 Beaumont-Hague
 Bricquebec
 Cherbourg-Octeville-Nord-Ouest
 Cherbourg-Octeville-Sud-Est
 Cherbourg-Octeville-Sud-Ouest
 Équeurdreville-Hainneville
 Montebourg
 Les Pieux
 Quettehou
 Sainte-Mère-Église
 Saint-Pierre-Église
 Saint-Sauveur-le-Vicomte
 Tourlaville
 Valognes

References

Cherbourg
Cherbourg-en-Cotentin